Acleris variana, the eastern blackheaded budworm, is a moth of the family Tortricidae. It is found in Newfoundland and Cape Breton Island and the north-eastern United States, across the coniferous forest region of Canada, presumably to Saskatchewan or eastern Alberta.

The larvae mainly feed on Abies balsamea (Balsam Fir) and Picea glauca (White Spruce).

References

variana
Moths of North America
Moths described in 1886